Peer Review is a quarterly magazine published by the Association of American Colleges and Universities that reports "emerging trends and key debates in undergraduate liberal education". It was established in early 2000 and the editor-in-chief is Shelley Johnson Carey. The magazine is based in Washington DC.

References

External links
 

Quarterly magazines published in the United States
Education magazines
English-language magazines
Magazines established in 2000
Peer review
Magazines published in Washington, D.C.